Madicken is a fictional character created by the Swedish author Astrid Lindgren. Madicken appeared in six books, two films — Du är inte klok Madicken (1979) (You're out of your mind, Maggie) and Madicken på Junibacken (1980) (Meg of June Hill) — and a TV series (1979).

Du är inte klok Madicken is about a 7-year-old middle class girl, during World War I. The follow-up movie Madicken på Junibacken from 1980 is edited from various episodes of the TV production "Madicken" which screened in 1980. However, the events of the first film are set after the second film.

Her full name is Margareta Engström, but the only time anyone uses it is when admonishing her. Her mother is a housewife - they have a maid/nanny named Alva who does the work around the house—and her father is the editor-in-chief of the local newspaper.

See also 

 Emil i Lönneberga
 Ronia the Robber's Daughter
 Pippi Longstocking

References

External links
 IMDB

Astrid Lindgren characters
Swedish children's novels
Series of books
Swedish children's literature
Fictional Swedish people
Fiction set in the 1910s
Literary characters introduced in 1960
1960 children's books
Book series introduced in 1960
Female characters in literature